The unadorned rock-wallaby (Petrogale inornata) is a member of a group of closely related rock-wallabies found in northeastern Queensland, Australia. It is paler than most of its relatives and even plainer, hence its common name.

The unadorned rock-wallaby is patchily distributed in coastal ranges from around Rockhampton to near Townsville. This range includes the small range of the Proserpine rock-wallaby (P. persephone), the only rock-wallaby in the region not closely related to its neighbours. Interbreeding threatens the latter species.

References

External links
John Gould's painting of Petrogale inornata

Macropods
Mammals of Queensland
Marsupials of Australia
Mammals described in 1842